The Roman Rite of the Catholic Church is celebrated worldwide but allows for certain liturgical aspects to vary by geographical area. The Roman Rite in the United States is under the purview of the United States Conference of Catholic Bishops; with the permission of the Holy See, the conference has made adaptations to the liturgical calendar and rubrics, and has promulgated liturgical books for use in the United States.

Proper calendars 

Proper calendars are those which build off of the General Calendar of the Roman Rite. The contents of particular calendars for the United States are listed below, with each entry prefaced by a notation indicating the type of change made from the basis of the general calendar.

National calendar 
The proper calendar for the United States is given in the U.S. edition of the Roman Missal.

Hispanic patronal feast day calendar 
This Spanish missal follows the national calendar given above, but also adds a section of Masses for the patronal feasts of Spanish-speaking nations. These feast days are intended to be celebrated with groups of immigrants from the corresponding countries.

Ordinariate calendar 

The Personal Ordinariate of the Chair of Saint Peter is a personal ordinariate for former Anglicans that encompasses the United States and Canada. The ordinariate has its own liturgical calendar that includes many English feast days.

See also 
 National calendars of the Roman Rite

Notes

References 

U